Galesburg City Township is one of twenty-one townships in Knox County, Illinois, USA.  As of the 2010 census, its population was 32,195 and it contained 14,280 housing units.  It is coextensive with the city of Galesburg, which is mostly surrounded by Galesburg Township.

In the 2001 fiscal year, the township employed eighteen individuals and operated with expenditures of $849,752.

Geography

Cemeteries
The township contains these six cemeteries: Brookside, East Linwood, Hope, Lewis, Linwood and Memorial Park.

Airports and landing strips
 Galesburg Cottage Hospital Heliport
 Galesburg Municipal Airport

Demographics

School districts
 Abingdon Community Unit School District 217
 Galesburg Community Unit School District 205
 Knoxville Community Unit School District 202

Political districts
 Illinois's 17th congressional district
 State House District 74
 State Senate District 37

References
 
 United States Census Bureau 2009 TIGER/Line Shapefiles
 United States National Atlas

External links
 City-Data.com
 Illinois State Archives
 Township Officials of Illinois

Townships in Knox County, Illinois
Galesburg, Illinois micropolitan area
Townships in Illinois